The United Ghana Movement is a political party in Ghana. The founder is Charles Wereko-Brobby, formerly a leading member of the New Patriotic Party.

Registration
The party was officially registered with the Electoral Commission of Ghana as a political party in Ghana on 10 January 1997.

Electoral performance

2000 elections
The first general elections the party contested were the presidential and parliamentary elections of December 2000. Charles Wereko-Brobby stood for president on the party's ticket in December 2000 and came seventh with 0.3% of the popular vote. The party also contested the parliamentary elections in the same year but won no seats.

Parliamentary elections

Presidential elections

Party on vacation
In 2002, the leader of the party, Wereko-Brobby announced that the party is on vacation.

Symbols
The party symbols are as follows:
Motto - Growing people for Ghana's development.
Symbol - A clenched fist of the hand with the index and middle fingers raised together.
Colours - Blue, White and Green

See also
List of political parties in Ghana

References

External links
 UGM information on Ghana Review International

1997 establishments in Ghana
Political parties established in 1997
Political parties in Ghana